1st Intelligence Battalion (1st Intel) is a Marine Corps Intelligence military intelligence and counter intelligence unit based at Marine Corps Base Camp Pendleton. They provide the I Marine Expeditionary Force with intelligence products and analysis.

Mission
Responsible for planning, directing, collecting, processing, producing and disseminating intelligence, and providing counterintelligence support to the Marine Expeditionary Force (MEF), MEF Major Subordinate Commands, subordinate Marine Air Ground Task Forces (MAGTF), and other commands as directed.

Subordinate units

 Headquarters Company
 Production and Analysis Company
 Counterintelligence/Human Intelligence Company
 Production and Analysis Support Company
 Counterintelligence/Human Intelligence Support Company

Unit awards

 Presidential Unit Citation
 Joint Meritorious Unit Citation
 Navy Unit Commendation
 Meritorious Unit Commendation
 National Defense Service Medal
 Armed Forces Expeditionary Medal
 Southwest Asia Service Medal
 Global War on Terrorism Expeditionary Medal

Unit awards
A unit citation or commendation is an award bestowed upon an organization for the action cited. Members of the unit who participated in said actions are allowed to wear on their uniforms the awarded unit citation. 1st Intelligence Battalion has been presented with the following awards:

References

External links
 1st Intel's official website

1st Intelligence Battalion